Malaysia participated in the 2010 Summer Youth Olympics in Singapore. The Malaysian team consisted of 13 athletes, seven male and six female, who competed in six sports: aquatics (swimming and diving), athletics, badminton, rhythmic gymnastics, sailing and weightlifting. The chef-de-mission of the contingent was former national swimmer Alex Lim, who competed in the 2004 Summer Olympics in Athens.

Diver Pandelela Rinong Pamg became the first Malaysian to win a medal in the Youth Olympics after placing second in the girls' 10m platform event. She later won another silver medal in the girls' 3m springboard event.

Medalists

Athletics

Boys
Track event

Field events

Badminton

Boys

Girls

Diving

Boys

Girls

Gymnastics

Rhythmic

Girls

Sailing

One Person Dinghy

Swimming

Weightlifting

References

External links
 Competitors List: Malaysia

2010 in Malaysian sport
Nations at the 2010 Summer Youth Olympics
Malaysia at the Youth Olympics